The Peitian Temple is a temple of the Chinese Goddess Mazu at the intersection of Kaiyuan and Guangfu Roads in Puzi City, Chiayi County, on Taiwan.

History
The Peitian Temple was established in 1682 and is responsible for the development of Puzi, which grew up around it.

Architecture
The temple faces south.

Services
The Peitian Temple is a center of Mazu worship and pilgrimage on Taiwan. Veneration is also paid to her guardians Qianliyan ("Thousand-mile Eye"), Shunfeng'er ("Wind-following Ear"), and Grampa Tiger.

See also
 Qianliyan & Shunfeng'er
 Fengtian Temple
 Gangkou Temple
 List of Mazu temples around the world
 List of temples in Taiwan
 Religion in Taiwan

References

External links

 . 

Religious buildings and structures in Chiayi County
Mazu temples in Taiwan